Tamási is a district in north-western part of Tolna County. Tamási is also the name of the town where the district seat is found. The district is located in the Southern Transdanubia Statistical Region.

Geography 
Tamási District borders with Enying District and Sárbogárd District (Fejér County) to the north, Paks District and Szekszárd District to the east, Bonyhád District and Hegyhát District (Baranya County) to the south, Dombóvár District to the southwest, Tab District and Siófok District (Somogy County) to the west. The number of the inhabited places in Tamási District is 32.

Municipalities 
The district has 3 towns, 2 large villages and 27 villages.
(ordered by population, as of 1 January 2013)

The bolded municipalities are cities, italics municipalities are large villages.

See also
List of cities and towns in Hungary

References

External links
 Postal codes of the Tamási District

Districts in Tolna County